Murray Bookchin (January 14, 1921 – July 30, 2006) was an American social theorist, author, orator, historian, and political philosopher. A pioneer in the environmental movement, Bookchin formulated and developed the theory of social ecology and urban planning within anarchist, libertarian socialist, and ecological thought. He was the author of two dozen books covering topics in politics, philosophy, history, urban affairs, and social ecology. Among the most important were Our Synthetic Environment (1962), Post-Scarcity Anarchism (1971), The Ecology of Freedom (1982), and Urbanization Without Cities (1987). In the late 1990s, he became disenchanted with what he saw as an increasingly apolitical "lifestylism" of the contemporary anarchist movement, stopped referring to himself as an anarchist, and founded his own libertarian socialist ideology called "communalism", which seeks to reconcile and expand Marxist, syndicalist, and anarchist thought.

Bookchin was a prominent anti-capitalist and advocate of social decentralization along ecological and democratic lines. His ideas have influenced social movements since the 1960s, including the New Left, the anti-nuclear movement, the anti-globalization movement, Occupy Wall Street, and more recently, the democratic confederalism of the Autonomous Administration of North and East Syria. He was a central figure in the American green movement and the Burlington Greens.

Biography 

Bookchin was born in New York City to Russian Jewish immigrants Nathan Bookchin and Rose (Kaluskaya) Bookchin. He grew up in the Bronx, where his grandmother, Zeitel, a Socialist Revolutionary, imbued him with Russian populist ideas. After her death in 1930, he joined the Young Pioneers, the Communist youth organization (for children 9 to 14) and the Young Communist League (for youths) in 1935. He attended the Workers School near Union Square, where he studied Marxism. In the late 1930s he broke with Stalinism and gravitated toward Trotskyism, joining the Socialist Workers Party (SWP). In the early 1940s, he worked in a foundry in Bayonne, New Jersey, where he was a trade union organizer and shop steward for the United Electrical Workers as well as a recruiter for the SWP. Within the SWP, he adhered to the Goldman-Morrow faction, which broke away after the war ended. He was an auto worker and UAW member at the time of the great General Motors strike of 1945–46. In 1949, while speaking to a Zionist youth organization at City College, Bookchin met a mathematics student, Beatrice Appelstein, whom he married in 1951. They were married for 12 years and lived together for 35, remaining close friends and political allies for the rest of his life. They had two children, Debbie and Joseph. On religious views, Bookchin was an atheist, but was considered to be tolerant of religious views.

From 1947, Bookchin collaborated with a fellow lapsed Trotskyist, the German expatriate Josef Weber, in New York in the Movement for a Democracy of Content, a group of 20 or so post-Trotskyists who collectively edited the periodical Contemporary Issues – A Magazine for a Democracy of Content. Contemporary Issues embraced utopianism. The periodical provided a forum for the belief that previous attempts to create utopia had foundered on the necessity of toil and drudgery; but now modern technology had obviated the need for human toil, a liberatory development. To achieve this "post-scarcity" society, Bookchin developed a theory of ecological decentralism. The magazine published Bookchin's first articles, including the pathbreaking "The Problem of Chemicals in Food" (1952). In 1958, Bookchin defined himself as an anarchist, seeing parallels between anarchism and environmentalism. His first book, Our Synthetic Environment, was published under the pseudonym Lewis Herber, in 1962, a few months before Rachel Carson's famous Silent Spring. The book described a broad range of environmental ills, but received little attention because of its political radicalism.

In 1964, Bookchin joined the Congress of Racial Equality (CORE), and protested racism at the 1964 World's Fair. During 1964–67, while living on Manhattan's Lower East Side, he cofounded and was the principal figure in the New York Federation of Anarchists. His groundbreaking essay "Ecology and Revolutionary Thought" introduced environmentalism and, more specifically, ecology as a concept in radical politics. In 1968, he founded another group that published the influential Anarchos magazine, which published that and other innovative essays on post-scarcity and on sustainable technologies such as solar and wind energy, and on decentralization and miniaturization. Lecturing throughout the United States, he helped popularize the concept of ecology to the counterculture. His widely republished 1969 essay "Listen, Marxist!" warned Students for a Democratic Society (in vain) against an impending takeover by a Marxist group. "Once again the dead are walking in our midst," he wrote, "ironically, draped in the name of Marx, the man who tried to bury the dead of the nineteenth century. So the revolution of our own day can do nothing better than parody, in turn, the October Revolution of 1917 and the civil war of 1918–1920, with its 'class line,' its Bolshevik Party, its 'proletarian dictatorship,' its puritanical morality, and even its slogan, 'Soviet power'". These and other influential 1960s essays are anthologized in Post-Scarcity Anarchism (1971).

In 1969–1970, he taught at the Alternate U, a counter-cultural radical school based on 14th Street in Manhattan. In 1971, he moved to Burlington, Vermont, with a group of friends, to put into practice his ideas of decentralization. In the fall of 1973, he was hired by Goddard College to lecture on technology; his lectures led to a teaching position and to the creation of the Social Ecology Studies program in 1974 and the Institute for Social Ecology (ISE) soon thereafter, of which he became the director. In 1974, he was hired by Ramapo College in Mahwah, New Jersey, where he quickly became a full professor. The ISE was a hub for experimentation and study of appropriate technology in the 1970s. In 1977–78 he was a member of the Spruce Mountain Affinity Group of the Clamshell Alliance. Also in 1977, he published The Spanish Anarchists, a history of the Spanish anarchist movement up to the revolution of 1936. During this period, Bookchin briefly forged some ties with the nascent libertarian movement, speaking at a Libertarian Party convention and contributing to a newsletter edited by Karl Hess. Nevertheless, Bookchin rejected the types of libertarianism that advocated unconstrained individualism.

In From Urbanization to Cities (published in 1987 as The Rise of Urbanization and the Decline of Citizenship), Bookchin traced the democratic traditions that influenced his political philosophy and defined the implementation of the libertarian municipalism concept. A few years later, The Politics of Social Ecology, written by his partner of 19 years, Janet Biehl, briefly summarized these ideas.

In 1988, Bookchin and Howie Hawkins founded the Left Green Network "as a radical alternative to U.S. Green liberals", based around the principles of social ecology and libertarian municipalism.

In 1995, Bookchin lamented the decline of American anarchism into primitivism, anti-technologism, neo-situationism, individual self-expression, and "ad hoc adventurism," at the expense of forming a social movement. Arthur Verslius said, "Bookchin ... describes himself as a 'social anarchist' because he looks forward to a (gentle) societal revolution. ... Bookchin has lit out after those whom he terms 'lifestyle anarchists.'" The publication of Social Anarchism or Lifestyle Anarchism in 1995, criticizing this tendency, was startling to anarchists. Thereafter Bookchin concluded that American anarchism was essentially individualistic and broke with anarchism publicly in 1999. He placed his ideas into Communalism, a political ideology and form of libertarian socialism that retains his ideas about assembly democracy and the necessity of decentralization of settlement, power/money/influence, agriculture, manufacturing, etc. His last major published work was The Third Revolution, a four-volume history of the libertarian movements in European and American revolutions.

He continued to teach at the ISE until 2004. Bookchin died of congestive heart failure on July 30, 2006, at his home in Burlington, at the age of 85.

Thought 
In addition to his political writings, Bookchin wrote extensively on philosophy, calling his ideas dialectical naturalism. The dialectical writings of Georg Wilhelm Friedrich Hegel, which articulate a developmental philosophy of change and growth, seemed to him to lend themselves to an organic, environmentalist approach. Although Hegel "exercised a considerable influence" on Bookchin, he was not, in any sense, a Hegelian. His philosophical writings emphasize humanism, rationality, and the ideals of the Enlightenment.

Bookchin does not clearly define many of the key terms of his philosophy.

General sociological and psychological views 
Bookchin was critical of class-centered analysis of Marxism and simplistic anti-state forms of libertarianism and liberalism and wished to present what he saw as a more complex view of societies. In The Ecology of Freedom: The Emergence and Dissolution of Hierarchy, he says that:

My use of the word hierarchy in the subtitle of this work is meant to be provocative. There is a strong theoretical need to contrast hierarchy with the more widespread use of the words class and State; careless use of these terms can produce a dangerous simplification of social reality. To use the words hierarchy, class, and State interchangeably, as many social theorists do, is insidious and obscurantist. This practice, in the name of a "classless" or "libertarian" society, could easily conceal the existence of hierarchical relationships and a hierarchical sensibility, both of whicheven in the absence of economic exploitation or political coercion-would serve to perpetuate unfreedom.

Bookchin also points to an accumulation of hierarchical systems throughout history that has occurred up to contemporary societies which tends to determine the human collective and individual psyche:

The objective history of the social structure becomes internalized as a subjective history of the psychic structure. Heinous as my view may be to modern Freudians, it is not the discipline of work but the discipline of rule that demands the repression of internal nature. This repression then extends outward to external nature as a mere object of rule and later of exploitation. This mentality permeates our individual psyches in a cumulative form up to the present day-not merely as capitalism but as the vast history of hierarchical society from its inception.

Humanity's environmental predicament 
Murray Bookchin's book about humanity's collision course with the natural world, Our Synthetic Environment, was published six months before Rachel Carson's Silent Spring.

Bookchin rejected Barry Commoner's belief that the environmental crisis could be traced to technological choices, Paul Ehrlich's views that it could be traced to overpopulation, or the even more pessimistic view that traces this crisis to human nature. Rather, Bookchin felt that our environmental predicament is the result of the cancerous logic of capitalism, a system aimed at maximizing profit instead of enriching human lives: "By the very logic of its grow-or-die imperative, capitalism may well be producing ecological crises that gravely imperil the integrity of life on this planet."

The solution to this crisis, he said, is not a return to hunter-gatherer societies, which Bookchin characterized as xenophobic and warlike. Bookchin likewise opposed "a politics of mere protest, lacking programmatic content, a proposed alternative, and a movement to give people direction and continuity." He claims we needa constant awareness that a given society's irrationality is deep-seated, that its serious pathologies are not isolated problems that can be cured piecemeal but must be solved by sweeping changes in the often hidden sources of crisis and suffering—that awareness alone is what can hold a movement together, give it continuity, preserve its message and organization beyond a given generation, and expand its ability to deal with new issues and developments.The answer then lies in Communalism, a system encompassing a directly democratic political organization anchored in loosely confederated popular assemblies, decentralization of power, absence of domination of any kind, and replacing capitalism with human-centered forms of production.

Social ecology 
Social ecology is a philosophical theory about the relationship between ecological and social issues, associated with Murray Bookchin. It is not a movement but a theory primarily associated with Bookchin and elaborated over his body of work. He presents a utopian philosophy of human evolution that combines the nature of biology and society into a third "thinking nature" beyond biochemistry and physiology, which he argues is a more complete, conscious, ethical, and rational nature. Humanity, by this line of thought, is the latest development from the long history of organic development on Earth. Bookchin's social ecology proposes ethical principles for replacing a society's propensity for hierarchy and domination with that of democracy and freedom.

It emerged from a time in the mid-1960s, under the emergence of both the global environmental and the American civil rights movements, and played a much more visible role from the upward movement against nuclear power by the late 1970s. It presents ecological problems as arising mainly from social problems, in particular from different forms of hierarchy and domination, and seeks to resolve them through the model of a society adapted to human development and the biosphere. It is a theory of radical political ecology based on communalism, which opposes the current capitalist system of production and consumption. It aims to set up a moral, decentralized, united society, guided by reason. While Bookchin distanced himself from anarchism later in his life, the philosophical theory of social ecology is often considered to be a form of eco-anarchism.

Bookchin wrote about the effects of urbanization on human life in the early 1960s during his participation in the civil rights and related social movements. Bookchin then began to pursue the connection between ecological and social issues, culminating with his best-known book, The Ecology of Freedom, which he had developed over a decade. His argument, that human domination and destruction of nature follows from social domination between humans, was a breakthrough position in the growing field of ecology. Life develops from self-organization and evolutionary cooperation (symbiosis). Bookchin writes of preliterate societies organized around mutual need but ultimately overrun by institutions of hierarchy and domination, such as city-states and capitalist economies, which he attributes uniquely to societies of humans and not communities of animals. He proposes confederation between communities of humans run through democracy rather than through administrative logistics.

Bookchin's theory presents a vision of human evolution that combines the nature of biology and society into a third "thinking nature" beyond biochemistry and physiology, which he says is of a more complete, conscious, ethical, and rational nature. Humanity, according to this line of thought, is the latest development in the long history of organic development on Earth. Bookchin's social ecology proposes ethical principles for replacing a society's propensity for hierarchy and domination with that of democracy and freedom. He wrote about the effects of urbanization on human life in the early 1960s during his participation in the civil rights and related social movements. Bookchin then began to pursue the connection between ecological and social issues, culminating with his best-known book, The Ecology of Freedom, which he had developed over a decade. His argument, that human domination and destruction of nature follows from social domination between humans, was a breakthrough position in the growing field of ecology. He writes that life develops from self-organization and evolutionary cooperation (symbiosis). Bookchin writes of preliterate societies organized around mutual need but ultimately overrun by institutions of hierarchy and domination, such as city-states and capitalist economies, which he attributes uniquely to societies of humans and not communities of animals. He proposes confederation between communities of humans run through democracy rather than through administrative logistics.

Bookchin's work, beginning with anarchist writings on the subject in the 1960s, has continuously evolved. Towards the end of the 1990s, he increasingly integrated the principle of communalism, with aspirations more inclined towards institutionalized municipal democracy, which distanced him from certain evolutions of anarchism. Bookchin's work draws inspiration from anarchism (mainly Kropotkin) and communism (including the writings of Marx and Engels). Social ecology refuses the pitfalls of a Neo-Malthusian ecology which erases social relationships by replacing them with "natural forces", but also of a technocratic ecology which considers that environmental progress must rely on technological breakthroughs and that the state will play an integral role in this technological development. According to Bookchin, these two currents depoliticize ecology and mythologize the past and the future.

In May 2016, the first “International Social Ecology Meetings” were organized in Lyon, which brought together a hundred radical environmentalists, decreasing figures and libertarians, most of whom came from France, Belgium, Spain and Switzerland, but also from the United States, Guatemala and Canada. At the center of the debates: libertarian municipalism as an alternative to the nation state and the need to rethink activism.

The second edition of the meetings takes place in Bilbao, in October 2017.

Kurdish movement 
Bookchin's reflections on social ecology and libertarian municipalism also inspired Abdullah Öcalan, the historical leader of the Kurdish movement, to create the concept of democratic confederalism, which aims to bring together the peoples of the Middle East in a confederation of democratic, multicultural and ecological communes. Adopted by the Kurdistan Workers' Party (PKK) since 2005, Öcalan's project represents a major ideological shift away from their previous goal of establishing a Marxist-Leninist state. In addition to the PKK, Öcalan's internationalist project was also well received by its Syrian counterpart, the Party of Democratic Union (PYD), which would become the first organization in the world to actually found a society based on the principles of democratic confederalism. On January 6, 2014, the cantons of Rojava, in Syrian Kurdistan, federated into autonomous municipalities, adopting a social contract which established a decentralized non-hierarchy society, based on principles of direct democracy, feminism, ecology, cultural pluralism, participatory politics and economic cooperativism.

Municipalism and communalism 
Bookchin's vision of an ecological society is based on highly participatory, grassroots politics, in which municipal communities democratically plan and manage their affairs through popular assembly, a program he called Communalism. This democratic deliberation purposefully promotes autonomy and self-reliance, as opposed to centralized state politics. While this program retains elements of anarchism, it emphasizes a higher degree of organization (community planning, voting, and institutions) than general anarchism. In Bookchin's Communalism, these autonomous, municipal communities connect with each other via confederations.

Starting in the 1970s, Bookchin argued that the arena for libertarian social change should be the municipal level. In 1980 Bookchin used the term "libertarian municipalism" to describe a system in which libertarian institutions of directly democratic assemblies would oppose and replace the state with a confederation of free municipalities. In "The Next Revolution", Bookchin stresses the link that libertarian municipalism has with his earlier philosophy of social ecology. He writes:

Bookchin proposes that these institutional forms must take place within differently scaled local areas. In a 2001 interview he summarized his views this way:

Libertarian municipalism intends to create a situation in which the two powers—the municipal confederations and the nation state cannot coexist.

Legacy and influence 
Though Bookchin, by his own recognition, failed to win over a substantial body of supporters during his own lifetime, his ideas have nonetheless influenced movements and thinkers across the globe.

Among these are the Kurdish People's Protection Units (YPG) and closely aligned Kurdistan Workers' Party (PKK) in Turkey, which have fought the Turkish state since the 1980s to try to secure greater political and cultural rights for the country's Kurds. The PKK is designated as a terrorist organization by the Turkish and United States governments, while the YPG has been considered an ally of the US against ISIS. Though founded on a rigid Marxist–Leninist ideology, the PKK has seen a shift in its thought and aims since the capture and imprisonment of its leader, Abdullah Öcalan, in 1999. Öcalan began reading a variety of post-Marxist political theory while in prison, and found particular interest in Bookchin's works.

Öcalan attempted in early 2004 to arrange a meeting with Bookchin through his lawyers, describing himself as Bookchin's "student" eager to adapt his thought to Middle Eastern society. Bookchin was too ill to accept the request. In May 2004 Bookchin conveyed this message "My hope is that the Kurdish people will one day be able to establish a free, rational society that will allow their brilliance once again to flourish. They are fortunate indeed to have a leader of Mr. Öcalan's talents to guide them". When Bookchin died in 2006, the PKK hailed the American thinker as "one of the greatest social scientists of the 20th century", and vowed to put his theory into practice.

"Democratic confederalism", the variation on Communalism developed by Öcalan in his writings and adopted by the PKK, does not outwardly seek Kurdish rights within the context of the formation of an independent state separate from Turkey. The PKK claims that this project is not envisioned as being only for Kurds, but rather for all peoples of the region, regardless of their ethnic, national, or religious background. Rather, it promulgates the formation of assemblies and organizations beginning at the grassroots level to enact its ideals in a non-state framework beginning at the local level. It also places a particular emphasis on securing and promoting women's rights. The PKK has had some success in implementing its programme, through organizations such as the Democratic Society Congress (DTK), which coordinates political and social activities within Turkey, and the Koma Civakên Kurdistan (KCK), which does so across all countries where Kurds live.

Selected works 

 Post-Scarcity Anarchism (1971)
 The Spanish Anarchists: The Heroic Years (1977)
 The Ecology of Freedom: The Emergence and Dissolution of Hierarchy (1982)

See also
 Eco-socialism
 History of the Green Party of the United States
 Outline of libertarianism

References

Bibliography

Further reading

 Price, Andy, Recovering Bookchin: Social Ecology and the Crises of Our Time, New Compass (2012)
 Biehl, Janet, Ecology or Catastrophe: The Life of Murray Bookchin (Oxford University Press, 2015).
 Biehl, Janet, The Murray Bookchin Reader (Cassell, 1997) .
 Biehl, Janet, "Mumford Gutkind Bookchin: The Emergence of Eco-Decentralism" (New Compass, 2011) 
 Marshall, P. (1992), "Murray Bookchin and the Ecology of Freedom", pp. 602–622 in, Demanding the Impossible. Fontana Press. .
 Selva Varengo, La rivoluzione ecologica. Il pensiero libertario di Murray Bookchin (2007) Milano: Zero in condotta. .
 E. Castano, Ecologia e potere. Un saggio su Murray Bookchin, Mimesis, Milano 2011 .
 Damian F. White 'Bookchin – A Critical Appraisal'. Pluto Press (UK/Europe), University of Michigan Press.  (HBK);  (pbk).
 Neither Washington Nor Stowe: Common Sense For The Working Vermonter, by David Van Deusen, Sean West, and the Green Mountain Anarchist Collective (NEFAC-VT), Catamount Tavern Press, 2004. This libertarian socialist manifesto took many of Bookchin's ideas and articulated them as they would manifest in a revolutionary Vermont.

External links

 Murray Bookchin entry at the Anarchy Archives
 Murray Bookchin Papers at Tamiment Library and Robert F. Wagner Archives at New York University
 International Online Conference 2021: "100 years Murray Bookchin"
 Institute of Social Ecology (official site)

1921 births
2006 deaths
20th-century American historians
20th-century American male writers
20th-century American philosophers
21st-century American historians
21st-century American male writers
Jewish American atheists
American anarchists
American anti-capitalists
American anti-fascists
American anti-war activists
American environmentalists
American feminists
American libertarians
American male non-fiction writers
American non-fiction environmental writers
American people of Russian-Jewish descent
American political philosophers
American syndicalists
Anarchist theorists
Anarchist writers
Anti-consumerists
Decentralization
Degrowth advocates
Ecofeminists
Environmental philosophers
Environmental writers
Green anarchists
Green thinkers
Historians from New York (state)
Historians of anarchism
Jewish American historians
Jewish anarchists
Jewish anti-fascists
Judaism and environmentalism
Jewish feminists
Jewish philosophers
Jewish socialists
Left-libertarians
Libertarian socialists
New York (state) socialists
Social ecology (Bookchin)
Vermont socialists
Writers from Burlington, Vermont
Writers from New York City